Karin may refer to:
Karin (given name), a feminine name

Fiction
Karin (manga) or Chibi Vampire, a Japanese media franchise
Karin Hanazono, title character of the manga and anime Kamichama Karin
Karin Kurosaki, a character in Bleach media
Karin (Dragon Ball), a character in Dragon Ball media
Karin (Naruto), a character in Naruto media
Karin Kanzuki, a character in Street Fighter media
Karin Aoi, a character in DNA2 (Squared) media
Karin Asaka, a character in Love Live! Nijigasaki High School Idol Club
Karin, a fictional Japanese automobile manufacturer in the Grand Theft Auto series, primarily based on Toyota

Places
Karin (Greater Armenia), an ancient Armenian city in Greater Armenia, modern-day Erzurum
Karin (historic Armenia), a region encompassing parts of the Erzurum and Muş Provinces in present-day Turkey
Karin, Armenia, a village near Sasunik, Armenia
Karin, Ardabil, a village in Iran
Karin, Kerman, a village in Iran
Karin, Bari Somalia, a small town in Bari region, Somalia
Karin, Sahil, a historic port town in Sahil region, Somaliland
Karin, Yemen, a village near San‘a’, Yemen
, a village in Croatia near Obrovac
, a village in Croatia near Benkovac

Other uses
House of Karin, one of the Seven Parthian clans
KaRIN, vocalist of Collide
Karin A or Karine A, a ship impounded by the Israeli Defense Force while carrying 50 tons of weapons
Citroën Karin, a concept car
832 Karin, a minor planet in the asteroid belt and largest member of the Karin family of asteroids
Karin (花梨; also 榠樝), the Japanese name for the fruit of Pseudocydonia
KaRIn, Ka-band Radar Interferometer

See also

Karen (disambiguation)
Karie (disambiguation)

wuu:欧楂